The Nampa Depot in Nampa, Idaho, is a former passenger station on the Oregon Short Line Railroad, designed by Frederick W. Clarke. The 1-story, brick and sandstone depot was described in 1972 by Arthur A. Hart, director of the Idaho State Historical Museum, as "an interesting eclectic combination of Romanesque, Renaissance, and Baroque elements, with the latter dominating. A massive central block of French Renaissance form is flanked by two advancing Baroque bays that bulge dramatically forward." The depot was added to the National Register of Historic Places in 1972.

History
Soon after the founding of Nampa, a wood frame railway station was opened in 1887 at the connection between the Oregon Short Line Railroad and the Idaho Central Railway. The station quickly became insufficient to manage Nampa's passenger and freight traffic, and in 1902 a new station was planned.

The Nampa Depot opened in 1903, and it operated as a station until 1927 when a new depot was constructed. The 1903 depot was converted to office space for railroad employees in 1927, and it became the Nampa headquarters for the Canyon County Historical Society in 1973.

References

External links
 
 Nampa Train Depot Museum, Society of Architectural Historians
 Canyon County Historical Society

		
National Register of Historic Places in Canyon County, Idaho
Buildings and structures completed in 1903
Nampa, Idaho
Museums in Canyon County, Idaho
Former railway stations in Idaho